Schemer-Dreamer is the first solo album by Steve Walsh, the original keyboardist/vocalist of the progressive rock band Kansas. It was released in 1980. Although this is his solo album, it features other members of Kansas including Kerry Livgren, Phil Ehart, and Rich Williams, as well as future Kansas member Steve Morse.

Reception

In their retrospective review, AllMusic sarcastically suggested that the self-aggrandizing front cover of Schemer-Dreamer "very well could be the greatest album cover in rock history." They criticized the music itself as "a big, loud, dumb arena rock record, one that sounds completely tied to its year, if not month, of release", but also avouched that "it's kind of fun because of that".

Track listing

Personnel
Musicians
Steve Walsh - keyboards, lead vocals, vibes, drums (track 3)
Jeff Lux - electric guitar, acoustic guitar, vibraphone, flute, background vocals
David Bryson - electric guitar (track 2)
Kerry Livgren - guest electric guitar (track 4)
Rich Williams - guest electric and acoustic guitars (track 1)
Steve Morse -  guest electric guitar (track 7)
Merle McLain - bass (tracks 1, 2, 3, 7)
Duane Buckler - bass guitar (track 4, 5)
Turner Gaugh - bass (track 6)
Tim Gehrt - drums (tracks 1, 2, 4, 5, 6)
Phil Ehart - guest drums (track 7)
Vic Hancock - handclaps
Allen Sloan - violin, viola (track 6)
Skip Lane - saxophone (track 7)
Cecil Welch - trumpet (track 7)

Production
Brad Aaron, Davey Moiré - co-producers, engineers
David Pinkston, Les Horn - assistant engineers
George Marino - mastering at Sterling Sound, New York
Tom Drennon - art direction and design
Will Weston III - cover illustration
Marie Walsh, Chuck Sillery - photography

References

External links
Schemer-Dreamer at CD Universe

1980 debut albums
Epic Records albums
Steve Walsh (musician) albums